Christopher Columbus McGrath (May 15, 1902 – July 7, 1986) was an American lawyer and politician from New York. From 1949 to 1953, he served two terms in the U.S. House of Representatives.

Early life and education 
McGrath was born in New York City. He graduated from Clason Military Academy in the Bronx in 1921 and from Fordham University School of Law in 1924. He was admitted to the bar in 1927, and commenced the practice of law in New York City.

Political career 
He was a member of the New York State Assembly (Bronx Co., 6th D.) from 1928 through 1935.

He was elected as a municipal judge of New York City in 1935, was re-elected in 1945, and remained on the bench until his resignation on December 31, 1948.

Congress 
McGrath was elected as a Democrat to the 81st and 82nd United States Congresses, holding office from January 3, 1949, to January 3, 1953.

Later career and death 
He was elected Surrogate of Bronx County in 1952, and was re-elected in 1966.

He was a member of faculty of Fordham University School of Law, and was a resident of New York City until his death there in 1986.

He was buried at Gate of Heaven Cemetery in Hawthorne, New York.

References

External links

1902 births
1986 deaths
Fordham University School of Law alumni
Democratic Party members of the New York State Assembly
New York (state) state court judges
Burials at Gate of Heaven Cemetery (Hawthorne, New York)
Democratic Party members of the United States House of Representatives from New York (state)
Fordham University faculty
20th-century American lawyers
20th-century American politicians
20th-century American judges
Politicians from the Bronx